Sri is a 2002 Indian Tamil-language action drama film directed by Pushpavasagan which stars Suriya in the title role, with Shrutika and Gayatri Jayaraman in supporting roles.

Synopsis
Sri is a mercenary, longing for his father Sankara Iyer's love. He has been ostracized from his family because his father felt he had a hand in the death of his younger sister, and for refusing to stay silent about it. He is still in love with  Meenakshi from his old "Agraharam" and she in love with him, but their union is derided by Sankara Iyer.

Cast

Music

Soundtrack was composed by debutant T. S. Muralidharan. Noted film-maker R. V. Udayakumar wrote lyrics for some of the film's songs. Muralidharan took a hiatus after this film and only returned in 2020 with the Hindi film Godaam, for which he composed the background score.

Release
The Hindu opined that "The story could have been powerful and the screenplay appealing if the characters were logical in their actions and the flow had not been hampered by repulsive group dances and irrelevant sequences". Chennai Online wrote "'Sri' looks like an extension of ‘Nandha' with a slight change in ambience. It’s like they had gone and shot a few more scenes for the earlier film!". BizHat wrote "The `rowdy` genre, which seems to be hot among film makers and actors now is once again tested here by director Pushpagavasan. However, he seems to have been influenced by films of the same genre like the Mohanlal classic Kireedam and the recent Tamizh. The only saving grace of the film is the steel strong performance of Surya as Sri, the ‘dada’ with a golden heart". Cinema Today wrote "With the story itself hanging by a weak thread, its no surprise that the screenplay and characters are just drifting in and out. Poor Fans! They have only Surya's involvement with the story and the film to console themselves with".

Sri remains director Pushpavasagan's only release. In 2006, he briefly worked on a project titled Uthama Puthran with Vikranth, but the film was stalled.

References

External links
 

2002 films
2000s Tamil-language films
Indian action films
2002 directorial debut films
2002 action films